Lancelot Yank Terry (February 11, 1911 – November 4, 1979) was a pitcher in Major League Baseball who played his entire career for the Boston Red Sox (1940, 1942–1945). He batted and threw right-handed.

He made his big league debut on August 3, 1940 during a double-header against the Detroit Tigers at Tiger Stadium. Terry picked up his first career win on August 17, 1940 at Fenway Park against the Washington Senators in a 12–9 win in front of 7,800 fans.

Terry's final appearance in the big leagues came July 20, 1945 during a 6–3 Red Sox loss to the visiting Chicago White Sox in front of 4,284 fans.

In a five-year career, Terry posted a 20–28 record with 167 strikeouts and a 4.09 ERA in 457.1 innings.

Yank Terry died in Bloomington, Indiana, at the age of 68. He is buried in Cresthaven Cemetery in Bedford, Indiana.

References 

2. Retrosheet .

External links 

Boston Red Sox players
Major League Baseball pitchers
Baseball players from Indiana
People from Bedford, Indiana
1911 births
1979 deaths
Pacific Coast League MVP award winners